Maritigrella fuscopunctata is a species of marine polyclad flatworm in the family Euryleptidae from Indo-Pacific

.

References

External links
 

Turbellaria
Animals described in 1977